The Main Street Museum is an eclectic display space for material culture and a civic organization in White River Junction, Vermont.

The museum's present form and activities resemble the 18th and 19th century "cabinet of curiosities" and point to an interest in the historic roots of museums and museology. However, the Museum also focuses on new technology, notably cataloging its collections and conducting online activity through its Wiki (see below).

Overview 
The Main Street Museum was founded in 1992 by David Fairbanks Ford in an area of White River Junction known as the Old South End.

The museum's collections of material culture are seemingly unfocused, although this might be the intent of the museum's highly decentralized administration. Categories include: Flora; Fauna; significant objects from around the world; evidence of tramps; Round Things; Tangled Things; journals; extraneous bits of local history; sheet music; postcard collections; electromagnetism devices; relics from the head injury of Phineas Gage; Elvis impersonators; live music; taxidermy and biological anomalies (dehydrated cats). It simultaneously pays homage to the eighteenth century Wünderkammern and a focal point of new technology through its website. The Main Street Museum believes itself to have been the first museum in the world with a (functioning) blog, initiated in September 2005.

Described by the Washington Post as "quirky and avant-garde", a heterodox assortment of the local public, scholars, musicians, artists, historians, scientists, drunks and all other types of people have been drawn to the museum's unusual demonstrations, lectures and entertainments.

Currently located at White River Junction's former fire station on Bridge Street, next to the railroad underpass on the banks of the White River, the museum has been acknowledged as an integral part of White River Junction's downtown revitalization and the new urbanism of the region. The museum has been host to prominent, freighthopping musicians and tramps since 1999. Current publication projects of the Museum include a Seminole War era journal and Dictionary of Seminole, or Muskogean Creek, words, from Florida, 1839 through 1842. 
“The Main Street Museum forces one to contemplate the nature of museums and curating. Why do we save what we save? How do we decide what to discard, what to display, what to hide away, and what to destroy.”
— Joe Citro, Weird New England, New York, 2006

The Catawiki 
A catalog of the museum, as well as other pages describing the museum's collections and civic activities, was formatted and presented with Wiki software in the year 2008. Museum goals include cataloging every item in their collections in this ongoing project.

Publications
What is It? We Have It! You Want to See It!, Description of the organization. White River Junction, 2008.
Description of the Collections, with pl., White River Junction, 2007.
The Arts; All Of Them, In White River Junction, Vermont, Hartford, 2000.
“There Ought To Be A Plaque,” article on Main Street Museum Building and White River Jct. history, Out In The Mountains, Burlington, VT, February, 1998.
The Mangelsdorf Tripartite Theory of Corn Genetics, Published by the Museum, with pls. Hartford, Vermont, 1998.
Pickled Eggs In Tar, An Intermittently Sulfurous Specimen, fl;189;66;em, “Number 001 in the Series...Prepared Under the Auspices Of The First Branch Memorial,” Hartford Village, 1998.
"The Diary of Sabrina Hoisington,” Vermont Genealogy, vol. 1, no. 2 April 1996. (Separately published as a booklet, with pls, 1997.)
Big Fish and Good Looking Women (exhibit catalogue for the photos of Jack Rowell), Main Street Museum, White River Jct., 1996.

References

Bibliography
Steve Zind, Feature on Main Street Museum, Vermont Public Radio, September, 2007.
Joe Citro, Weird New England, Barnes and Noble, 2006.
Jody Tilman, “Main Street Museum to Move Into Old White River Fire Station,” Valley News, 28 July 2003, p. a-1.
Jeffrey Rouff, (independent film) “A Day in the Life” documentary themed on one day in the life of White River Jct. and the Main Street Museum, 2003.
William Craig, “The Ivory Tower and Tunnel Town,” Valley News, 12 June 2003, p. c-1.
Joe Citro and Diane E. Foulds, Curious New England, The Unconventional Traveler’s Guide to Eccentric Destinations, University Press of New England. 2003.
James Bissland, “Watch Your Head,” Long River Winding, Berkshire House, Lee, 2003, 223- 227.
Jody Tilman, “House of Quirks in Search of Home,” Valley News, Jan. 1, 2003, p. a-1.
Mark Bushnell, “Life in the Past Lane” (feature) “An offbeat museum in Hartford sows confusion and fun,” Vermont Sunday Magazine, (Rutland/Barre) 14 July 2002, pp. 6, 13.
Pamela Polston, “Collect Calls,” Seven Days, Burlington, VT, 23 May 2001, cover and pp. 8a-12a.
Olivia Gentile, “David Fairbanks Ford; A Fan of Cyber-Space Creativity, He Believes That Art Is In The Eye Of The Beholder.” Rutland Daily Herald, “In Person,” Rutland, VT, 3 November 2000, p. 9.

————, “Artists’ Warehouse Thrives,” Rutland Daily Herald, 26 March 1998, p. 15.
James Bandler, “Exiles on Main Street,” Boston Globe, Oct. 1997, also pub. Rutland Sunday Herald, with pls.
John Greg, “No Cover Up,” Rutland Herald, 12 Oct., 1995, pp. 8–9, with pl.
“Elvis Art in a Jar,” The Burlington Free Press, Burlington, VT, Wednesday, August 3, 1994, d-1.
Yvonne Daley, “The King Is Alive In Vt. Elvis Wannabes Love Him Tender At White River Jct. Art Show,” The Sunday Rutland Herald and Sunday Times Argus, August 28, 1994, pp. 1, 6, with pl. p. 6, and; The Boston Globe, Sunday, 28 Aug., 1994, p. c-2.
William Craig, “A Do-It-Yourself Art Museum,” The Valley News, Thursday, 27 May 1993, p. 29, with pl.

External links
Main Street Museum official website
Main Street Museum Wiki
Appraisal of both the Main Street Museum and White River Junction, The Boston Globe

Museums established in 1992
Museums in Windsor County, Vermont
White River Junction, Vermont
History museums in Vermont
Art museums and galleries in Vermont
Museums with wikis
Buildings and structures in Hartford, Vermont
1992 establishments in Vermont